Ameerpet is a residential hub located in the north-west part of Hyderabad, Telangana. Ameerpet is also a Mandal in Hyderabad District. The locality shares its borders with Sardar Patel Road and the National Highway 65. Though consisting of vacant plots till a few years back, the area is now bustling with some commercial and residential establishments.

Popular areas located close to Ameerpet include Panjagutta, Begumpet, Sanath Nagar and Somajiguda.

Until the early 90s, the area mostly consisted of vacant plots, Jagirdar lands, Nawabs Houses, Estates and roadside restaurants to serve the traffic along NH9 to Bombay. Commercial activity first shifted here from the center of the city in the 1990s with the expansion of the northern suburbs of Hyderabad due to ongoing construction activity in the area and its surrounding areas. Today it is a bustling locality with several commercial establishments along with high pedestrian and vehicular traffic.

History
The land was gifted by then 6th Nizam of Hyderabad (Mahbub Ali Khan, Asaf Jah VI) to one of his Jagirdars named Amir Ali in the early 1900s. He built a small palace as his summer home and used the area as a summer resort since it was densely vegetated and had a pleasant climate and also water bodies. This palace now houses the "Nature Cure Hospital".

The third observatory of India called the "Nizamia Observatory" was set up here in Ameerpet by the Nizams. In 1908, Nawab Zafar Jung studied astronomy in England and he returned to Hyderabad along with two telescopes and an expert, whom he promised a net salary of 1500 osmania sikkas per month. He offered the telescopes to the Nizam, who ordered the installation of the telescopes at Ameerpet, where they remained for the next 50 years. The whole work of the ‘Carte due Cite’ Hyderabad Section was completed under the direction of T.P. Huascaran, who had published the remaining volumes of the astrographic catalog and this brought the work to a successful conclusion.

In 1923, the equatorial telescope by G. Rubb was erected and a Milne-Shaw seismograph was installed for the study of earthquakes and a second machine was added in 1929. A special underground chamber was constructed to house these delicate instruments. In 1928, at the request of the International Astronomical Union, the section of the sky originally allotted to the observatory at Potsdam (Germany) was undertaken by the Nizamia Observatory. The work of measurement and reduction was completed and three volumes were published by the International Astronomical Union. This observatory still stands here as a testimony to the development of Ameerpet.

The rest of the land of Ameerpet, after the merger of Hyderabad into the Indian Union, was later on passed on to his heirs who sold it in bits and pieces to other Jagirdars, nawabs, and other settlers. Most of these settlers were immigrants from neighboring states Andhra Pradesh and also other states of India namely Rajasthan, UP, Maharashtra, Punjab, and Tamil Nadu. The substantial part of the land is still with Nawabs and Jagirdars. The value of land from the early 60s up to late 80s commanded higher prices than posher areas like Banjara Hills and Jubilee Hills because of its proximity to Highway and Industrial areas.

Commerce
Ameerpet is known for its commerce and business of all kinds, but mainly as an education hub. It has several retail stores and many educational institutions like PAGE, TIME, PTE Academy, Ameerpet.org etc. which help students to get admission into institutes for pursuing higher studies.

Software training hub 
Ameerpet is also a well-known destination for software training in India. Students from different parts of the country come to Ameerpet to join software training courses. They avail of quality software training at relatively low prices in online. Now offering online software trainings. As a result, Ameerpet is also gaining a worldwide reputation and people from other countries are also starting to come here to get trained in various kinds of software. Not only from India but even from various other parts of the world also students come to take coaching in software training online. A well-known Center for development of advance computing (C-DAC Hyderabad) is located in this area.

Transport 
The Hyderabad Metro has Ameerpet metro station as a changeover station between Lines 1 and 3.

Buses run by TSRTC connect Ameerpet with all parts of the city.

The closest MMTS Train station is at Nature Cure hospital Railway Station and Begumpet Railway Station

Major landmarks 

Landmarks include Nizamia Observatory, Saradhi Studios, HUDA Maitrivanam, Huda Swarna Jayanti Complex, Aditya Enclave, Aditya Trade Centre, Aster Prime Hospital, Ameerpet Gurudwara, Ameerpet IT Training Centre Masjid-E-Akhtarunissa Begum, Vcare Multi Speciality Hospital, Elephant House, and Training and Consulting Services & VASAVI MPM GRAND

Other Details 
The pin code number 500016 belongs to Hyderabad, Telangana which covers 2 post offices. The first two digit of pin code denotes 50, which is listed in Telangana.

References 
1

Neighbourhoods in Hyderabad, India
Shopping districts and streets in India